In enzymology, a D-glutamyltransferase is an enzyme that catalyzes the chemical reaction

L(or D)-glutamine + D-glutamyl-peptide  NH3 + 5-glutamyl-D-glutamyl-peptide

The 3 substrates of this enzyme are L-glutamine, D-glutamine, and D-glutamyl-peptide, whereas its two products are NH3 and 5-glutamyl-D-glutamyl-peptide.

This enzyme belongs to the family of transferases, specifically the aminoacyltransferases.  The systematic name of this enzyme class is glutamine:D-glutamyl-peptide 5-glutamyltransferase. Other names in common use include D-glutamyl transpeptidase, and D-gamma-glutamyl transpeptidase.  This enzyme participates in d-glutamine and d-glutamate metabolism.

References

 

EC 2.3.2
Enzymes of unknown structure